Alban Jusufi (born July 7, 1981) is a Swedish-Albanian football player. He has also played for Vllaznia Shkodër.

Jusufi has played in the Superettan for Ängelholm and Trelleborg.

References

External links
 

Swedish footballers
1981 births
Living people
KF Vllaznia Shkodër players
Havant & Waterlooville F.C. players
Association football forwards
Högaborgs BK players
People from Ängelholm Municipality